Carodista cultrata is a moth in the family Lecithoceridae. It is found in Taiwan.

The wingspan is 13–15 mm. The forewings are relatively narrow, elongate and heavily covered with brown scales throughout. There is a visible fuscous streak at the end of the cell vertically. The hindwings are extremely oblique, pale grey and broader towards the base.

Etymology
The species name is derived from Latin culter (meaning knife-shaped) and refers to the median lobe in the lammella postivaginalis of the female genitalia.

References

Moths described in 1999
Carodista